The Feast of Life is a 1916 American silent drama film directed by Albert Capellani and starring Clara Kimball Young. It was distributed by the World Film Company.

Cast
Clara Kimball Young as Aurora Fernandez
Mrs. E.M. Kimball as Senora Fernandez (credited as Pauline Kimball)
Edward Kimball as Father Venture
Paul Capellani as Don Armada
Doris Kenyon as Celida
Robert Frazer as Pedro

Production
Portions of the film were shot in Cuba.

Preservation status
The Library of Congress website does not list any film archives as holding a copy of The Feast of Life. However, the Greta de Groats Clara Kimball Young webpage states that a copy of the film is held at the Národní Filmový Archiv, Czech Republic.

References

External links

1916 films
American silent feature films
American black-and-white films
Films directed by Albert Capellani
World Film Company films
Silent American drama films
1916 drama films
1910s American films